The Best Years of Our Lives is the eighteenth studio album by Neil Diamond.  It was released by Columbia Records in 1988 and reached number 46 on the Billboard 200 chart, number 42 on the UK album chart, and number 92 on the Australian chart.
The album was certified gold by the RIAA on February 16, 1989.  In his review of The Best Years of Our Lives music critic Bryan Buss referred to it as "a strong entry in Diamond's oeuvre" and as "an album that is romantic and sentimental without being manipulative".

Three singles from the album, the title track, "This Time", and "Baby Can I Hold You" reached numbers 7, 9, and 28, respectively on Billboard's Adult Contemporary chart.  Cash Box said of the title track that it was "not a terribly inspired tune, but served up with predictable skill by Mr. D."

Track listing

Personnel 
 Lead vocals – Neil Diamond
 Backing vocals – Bill Champlin, Tamara Champlin, Renée Geyer and Richard Page
 Keyboards – Michael Boddicker, Robbie Buchanan, David Foster, Tom Hensley, Alan Lindgren, Michael Omartian and David Paich
 Synthesizer programming – Rick Bowen, Rhett Lawrence and Kevin Maloney
 Acoustic guitars – Richard Bennett and Dean Parks
 Electric guitars – Michael Landau, Steve Lukather and Dean Parks
 Bass – Mike Brignardello and Reinie Press
 Drums – Tris Imboden, Paul Leim and Carlos Vega
 Horns – Gary Grant, Jerry Hey, Dan Higgins, Bill Reichenbach Jr. and Larry Williams
 Horn arrangements – David Foster and Jerry Hey
 String arrangements – Jeremy Lubbock

Production 
 Produced and Arranged by David Foster
 Production Coordination – Sam Cole and Chris Earthy
 Production Assistants – Ned Brown, Barry Cardinale, Larry E. Williams and Alison Zanetos
 Engineer – Jeffrey Woodruff 
 Assistant Engineers – Jesse Kanner, Ray Pyle and Dave Reitzas.
 Mixing – Humberto Gatica
 Mix Assistants – Mauricio Guerrero and Laura Livingston 
 Mastered by George Marino at Sterling Sound (New York, NY).
 Art Direction and Design – David Kirschner
 Additional Design – Beverley Lazor-Bahr
 Photography – Matthew Rolston

References

Neil Diamond albums
Columbia Records albums
Albums produced by David Foster
1988 albums
Albums recorded at A&M Studios
Albums recorded at United Western Recorders